"Riders on the Storm" is a song by American rock band the Doors. It was released in June 1971, as the second single from L.A. Woman, their sixth studio album and the last with lead singer Jim Morrison. The song reached number 14 on the U.S Billboard Hot 100, number 22 on the UK Singles Chart, and number seven in the Netherlands.

Background and composition
"Riders on the Storm" has been classified as a psychedelic rock, jazz rock, art rock song, and a precursor of gothic music. According to guitarist Robby Krieger and keyboardist Ray Manzarek, it was inspired by the country song "(Ghost) Riders in the Sky: A Cowboy Legend", written by Stan Jones and popularized by Vaughn Monroe. The lyrics were written and brought to rehearsal by Morrison, of which a portion of it refers to hitchhiking killer Billy "Cockeyed" Cook, who was the subject of the 1953 film, The Hitch-Hiker. Manzarek noted that some lines express Morrison's love to his companion Pamela Courson. The track is notated in the key of E Minor; the main keyboard riff descends throughout the pitches of Dorian Mode scale, and features a progression of i–IV–i7–IV.

It is popularly believed that "Riders on the Storm" is the song that longtime Doors producer Paul A. Rothchild disparaged as "cocktail music", precipitating his departure from the L.A. Woman sessions, which was corroborated by guitarist Robby Krieger. Rothchild himself denied that claim, stating that he actually applied the epithet to "Love Her Madly". Following Rothchild's departure, longtime engineer Bruce Botnick was selected to take over production duties, alongside the Doors themselves.

"Riders on the Storm" was recorded at the Doors Workshop in December 1970 with the assistance of Botnick. Later in January 1971, after Morrison had recorded his main vocals, the group gathered at Poppi Studios to complete the mixing of L.A. Woman, at which Morrison then whispered the lyrics over them to create an echo effect. It was the last song recorded by all four members of the Doors, as well as the last song recorded by Morrison to be released in his lifetime. The single was released in June 1971, entering the Billboard Hot 100 the week ending July 3, 1971, the same week Morrison died.

Heidegger's influence
Speaking with Krieger and Manzarek, the German philosopher Thomas Collmer argued that the line "Into this world we're thrown" recalls philosopher Martin Heidegger's concept of "thrownness"—human existence as a basic state. In 1963, at Florida State University in Tallahassee, Morrison heard a lecture which influenced him, which discussed philosophers who dealt critically with the philosophical tradition, including Friedrich Nietzsche and Heidegger. In 2009, Simon Critchley dedicated his column in The Guardian to Heidegger's thrownness, and explained it using the aforementioned verse of the song. The connection between the thrownness into the world and a dog's life was anticipated by the anti-Heideggerian author Ernst Bloch in his main work The Principle of Hope (1954–1959).

Legacy
Frequently listed among the Doors' greatest songs, "Riders on the Storm" has remained on classic rock radio playlists. In 2012, New York's Q104.3 ranked it the 498th best classic-rock song of all time.

Doors' drummer, John Densmore, released a book in 1990 entitled Riders on the Storm, detailing the story of his life and his time with the group. In 2010, the song was inducted into the Grammy Hall of Fame as a recording "of lasting qualitative or historical significance". Its lyrical content has inspired films such as The Hitcher (1986) and Point Break (1991). A remix of "Riders On The Storm" (feat. Snoop Dogg) by Fredwreck was used as title music for Need for Speed: Underground 2, released in 2004.

Personnel
The Doors
 Jim Morrisonvocals, whispers
 Ray ManzarekRhodes piano
 Robby Krieger electric guitar with tremolo
 John Densmoredrums

Additional musicians
 Jerry Scheffbass guitar

Charts and certifications

Weekly charts

Year-end charts

Certifications

Annabel Lamb version

 
In 1983, Annabel Lamb recorded a studio version of the song. It was released as a single from her debut album Once Bitten which peaked at number 27 on the UK Singles Chart. She performed the song later that year on Top of the Pops. This was the only hit single in UK in her career.

Charts

References

External links
 
 Usage in film and television: see "The Doors - Soundtrack. 'Riders on the Storm'" at IMDb
 Song lyrics at thedoors.com
 Accolades archived at Acclaimed Music

Songs about weather
1971 songs
1971 singles
1983 singles
The Doors songs
Songs written by John Densmore
Songs written by Robby Krieger
Songs written by Ray Manzarek
Songs written by Jim Morrison
Song recordings produced by Bruce Botnick
Elektra Records singles
A&M Records singles